The Eisenerzer Reichenstein is a mountain in the Ennstal Alps in the Austrian federal state of Styria. It lies south of the Erzberg near Eisenerz.

References 

Mountains of Styria
Mountains of the Alps
Two-thousanders of Austria
Ennstal Alps